Pantites (died c. 470s BC) was a Spartan warrior, one of the Three Hundred sent to the Battle of Thermopylae. King Leonidas I ordered Pantites on an embassy to Thessaly, possibly to recruit allies for the coming battle. However, Pantites failed to return to Thermopylae in time for the battle, arriving after all of his fellow soldiers had been killed. When he returned to Sparta, he was shunned as a "trembler" and made an outcast. Unable to live with his disgrace, he hanged himself.

See also
Eurytus of Sparta
Aristodemus of Sparta

References

Ancient Spartan soldiers
5th-century BC Spartans
Battle of Thermopylae
Suicides by hanging in Greece
470s BC deaths
Military history of ancient Thessaly
Ambassadors in Greek Antiquity
Year of birth unknown